The 2010 Open de Suède Vårgårda was the 5th road race running on the Open de Suède Vårgårda.

General standings (top 10)

Results from uci.ch.

References

External links
 Official website

2010 in women's road cycling
2010 in Swedish sport
2010 UCI Women's Road World Cup
Open de Suède Vårgårda